Elachisinidae is a family of sea snails, marine gastropod molluscs in the superfamily Truncatelloidea and the order Littorinimorpha.

Taxonomy 
Genera within the family Elachisinidae include:
 † Cirsope Cossmann, 1888 
 Dolicrossea Iredale, 1924
 Elachisina Dall, 1918
 † Entomope Cossmann, 1888 
 † Lacunella Deshayes, 1861
 Laeviphitus van Aartsen, Bogi & Giusti, 1989
 Laeviphitus verduini van Aartsen, Bogi & Giusti, 1989
 Ponderinella B. A. Marshall, 1988
  † Pseudocirsope O. Boettger, 1907
Genera brought into synonymy
 Microdochus Rehder, 1943: synonym of Elachisina Dall, 1918

References 

 Ponder, W. F. (1985). The anatomy and relationships of Elachisina Dall (Gastropoda Rissoacea. Journal of Molluscan Studies. 51(1): 23-34
 Cunha & Santos & Lima, New species of the genus Elachisina (Gastropoda: Elachisinidae) from northeastern Brazil; Zootaxa 4139 (1)  pp. 131–134, 2016

External links
 The Taxonomicon
 Bouchet, P. & Rocroi, J.-P. (2005). Classification and nomenclator of gastropod families. Malacologia. 47 (1-2): 1-397.

 
 
Taxa named by Winston Ponder